Friedrich Schertel (13 February 1890 – 5 April 1945) was a German cello virtuoso.

Life 
Born in Schweinfurt, Schertel was the youngest son of the bank accountant and later State bank director Sigmund Schertel and his wife Marie Schertel, née Pfeiffer. After grammar school in Hof, he studied at the Ludwig Maximilian University of Munich.

From 1909 to 1912, he studied music at the Hochschule für Musik und Theater München. In 1913/14, he received private cello lessons from Julius Klengel in Leipzig. From 1919 to 1921, he was a cellist in Henri Marteau's String Quartet. In 1921/22, he was principal cellist with the Dresden Philharmonic. From 1922, he was a teacher at the University of Music and Theatre Leipzig. Among his pupils were Erich Hillmann and Hans Kral. In 1933, he also became a member of the Gewandhaus Orchestra in Leipzig. He was repeatedly invited to join the Bayreuth Festival Orchestra (1924/25, 1927/28, 1930/31, 1933/34, 1936–1944).

Schertel belonged to the string quartet of Walther Davisson. He was later a member of Hans Mlynarczyk's String Quartet (1923–1943) and the 's String Quartet (1938–1943) and of Fritz Weitzmann's Trio He also made solo appearances, bringing the Concerto for Violoncello and Orchestra by Fritz Reuter to its premiere in 1929 at the  under the conduct of Alfred Szendrei.

He was also a member of the Deutscher Tonkünstlerverband.

Family 
His brothers were Wilhelm Schertel (1883–1930), chemist and artist, and Ernst Schertel (1884–1958), writer and educator. A portrait sketch of the cellist made by Otto Pleß appeared in 1934 in an article on personalities of Leipzig musical life in the Zeitschrift für Musik. Schertel, a Catholic, was married to Magda Laier and the father of a son. Shertel was 55.

Further reading 
 Hans-Rainer Jung: Das Gewandhaus-Orchester. Seine Mitglieder und seine Geschichte seit 1743. Faber und Faber, Leipzig 2006, .
 Erich H. Müller (ed.): Deutsches Musiker-Lexikon. W. Limpert-Verlag, Dresden 1929.

References

External links 
 

German classical cellists
Academic staff of the University of Music and Theatre Leipzig
1890 births
1945 deaths
People from Schweinfurt
German civilians killed in World War II
Deaths by airstrike during World War II
20th-century cellists